Au Cap FC is a Seychellois association football club based in Au Cap that currently competes in the Seychelles Division Two.

History
Au Cap FC was promoted to the Seychelles First Division for the first time for the 2018 season. The club was relegated back to Division Two following the 2019–2020 season.

References

External links
Official Facebook
Global Sports Archive profile
National Football Teams profile

Football clubs in Seychelles